Sarah Hughes (born 1985) is an American figure skater.

Sarah Hughes or Sara Hughes may also refer to:

 Sarah T. Hughes (1896–1985), US District Court judge
 Sarah Hughes (journalist) (1972–2021), British journalist
 Sarah Hewson (née Hughes), British news reporter
 Sara Hughes (born 1995), American beach volleyball player
 Sara Hughes (artist) (born 1971), Canadian-born New Zealand artist